Underwoodia may refer to:
 Underwoodia (fungus), a genus in the ascomycete family Helvellaceae
 Underwoodia (millipede), a genus in the millipede family Caseyidae